Ophionella  is a group of plants in the family Apocynaceae first described as a genus in 1981. It contains only one accepted species, Ophionella arcuata, native to Eastern Cape Province of South Africa.

References

Monotypic Apocynaceae genera
Flora of South Africa
Asclepiadoideae
Taxa named by N. E. Brown